Kentucky Route 38, also known as KY 38, is a state highway in the U.S. state of Kentucky. Part of the State Secondary System, it runs east from U.S. Highway 421 in Harlan east via Brookside, Evarts, Benito, Black Bottom, and Holmes Mill to the Virginia state line. In Virginia, the road continues as secondary State Route 624 to Keokee; State Route 606 and primary State Route 68 provide access from Keokee to the town of Appalachia, Virginia.

Major intersections

References

0038
0038